Caribbean South America is a subregion of South America consisting of the countries that border the Caribbean Sea: Colombia and Venezuela.

By extension, The Guianas, while not bordering the Caribbean Sea directly, are commonly reckoned with this region, as well, on account of their close ties with Caribbean countries, e.g. through membership in the Caribbean Community.

See also
ABC islands
Southern Caribbean
Spanish Main
Trinidad and Tobago

References

Regions of the Caribbean
Regions of South America
Geography of the Caribbean
Geography of South America
Latin America and the Caribbean